Smithville is an unincorporated community in the northwest corner of Marion Township, Owen County, in the U.S. state of Indiana. It lies near the intersection of County Road 200 North (a.k.a. Smithville Road) and County Road 1400 West (a.k.a. Pleasant View Road), which is a community about fifteen miles west of the city of Spencer, the county seat.  Its elevation is 591 feet (180 m), and it is located at  (39.3208757 -87.0258451).

Geography
 Burger Cemetery is about two miles southeast of this community on Orman Road, about halfway between County Road 1250 West and County Road 1325 West, which is located at  (39.3028204 -87.0077890).
 Mast Cemetery is about one mile east of this community on County Road 1325 West, just south of County Road 200 North (a.k.a. Smithville Road) which is located at  (39.3164315 -87.0102893).
 Stephens Cemetery is about two miles northeast of this community on County Road 1325 West, just south of East County Road 300 South (a.k.a. Stephens Road) which is located at  (39.3380982 -87.0144562).

School districts
 Spencer-Owen Community Schools, including a high school.

Political districts
 State House District 46
 State Senate District 39

References

External links
 Roadside Thoughts for Smithville, Indiana

Unincorporated communities in Owen County, Indiana
Unincorporated communities in Indiana
Bloomington metropolitan area, Indiana